Soulamea is a genus of plant in family Simaroubaceae. They are shrubs or small trees, and are dioecious, with the exception of Soulamea amara, which has bisexual flowers. It is native to parts of Malesia in the West Pacific. From the Seychelles, Borneo, Bismarck Archipelago, Caroline Islands, Marshall Islands, New Caledonia, New Guinea and Maluku to the Solomon Islands and Vanuatu.

Species
According to Kew,
 Soulamea amara 
 Soulamea cardioptera 
 Soulamea cycloptera 
 Soulamea dagostinii 
 Soulamea fraxinifolia 
 Soulamea moratii 
 Soulamea muelleri 
 Soulamea pancheri 
 Soulamea pelletieri 
 Soulamea rigaultii 
 Soulamea terminalioides 
 Soulamea tomentosa 
 Soulamea trifoliata

References

 
Sapindales genera
Taxonomy articles created by Polbot